Folmer Wisti (8 May 190816 October 2000) was a Danish director, associate professor and philologist. He was the first Slavic philologist from Aarhus University. Wisti was the instigator and leader of the Danish Cultural Institute (originally Danish Society) from 1940 to 1983. In 1974, he founded the Foundation for International Understanding, today known as the Folmer Wisti Foundation for International Understanding.

From 1976, he was also the organizer of conferences Europe of the regions as well as the information sheet, Regional Contact.

Bibliography

Grænseløs kulturudveksling -Det Danske Kulturinstitut i 70 år, af dr.phil. Niels Finn Christiansen (suppleret af billedfortællinger ved cand.mag. Kenn Schoop), 2009.
Portræt: Thomas kluge, 1998, Det Nationalhistoriske Museum Frederiksborg

References

1908 births
2000 deaths
Danish male writers
Aarhus University alumni
20th-century Danish philosophers